The Delta D2 is an Australian diesel-powered helicopter, under development by Delta Helicopters of Tanah Merah, Queensland. The aircraft was publicly introduced in 2009 and is intended to be supplied as a kit for amateur construction.

By January 2013 the Delta Helicopters website was no longer available on the internet, and development of the design by Delta had ended.

Design and development
The D2 features a single three-bladed main rotor, a two-seats-in side-by-side configuration enclosed cockpit with a windshield, skid-type landing gear and a four-cylinder, air-cooled, two-stroke, turbocharged  DeltaHawk DH180 diesel engine made by DeltaHawk Engines, Inc.

The aircraft fuselage is made from welded steel tubing and covered in a composite fairing. Further details about the design have not been released.

Specifications (D2)

See also
 DF Helicopters DF334
 Dynali H2S
 Heli-Sport CH-7

References

External links
Official website archives on Archive.org
Photo of the Delta D2

2000s Australian sport aircraft
2000s Australian helicopters
Homebuilt aircraft
Single-engined piston helicopters